"Never Gonna Let You Go" is a popular song from 1982 written by the husband-and-wife songwriting team of Cynthia Weil and Barry Mann; Weil wrote the lyrics, while Mann wrote the music. It was first recorded by Dionne Warwick for her 1982 album Friends in Love, then by singer Stevie Woods for his 1982 album The Woman in My Life. However, its best-known rendition was by Brazilian musician and bandleader Sérgio Mendes, on his 1983 self-titled album. That version was sung by Joe Pizzulo and Leeza Miller.

Weil and Mann had originally submitted "Never Gonna Let You Go" to American funk band Earth, Wind & Fire, but they decided not to record the song.

Mendes, preparing for the release of his 1983 album, was quoted as saying, "All the other songs on the album were up and festive. I needed a ballad on the album, just to change the pace a bit." Mendes' version was a hit, matching the No. 4 peak of his previous best showing on the Billboard Hot 100 chart, "The Look of Love", in 1968. It spent four weeks at No. 1 on the Billboard Adult Contemporary chart and peaked at No. 28 on the Billboard R&B chart.

On the Radio & Records airplay chart the song debuted #26 on the May 13, 1983 issue; after six weeks it reached and peaked at #7 for one week; the single stayed on the top 10 for three weeks and remained on the chart for twelve weeks. The song was successful, especially in Brazil, being played on Rede Globo's soap opera Final Feliz.

Reception
In a June 2021 video posted on YouTube, record producer Rick Beato called "Never Gonna Let You Go" "the most complex pop song of all time", due to its frequent key changes and use of inverted chords and unusual chord progressions.

Chart performance

Weekly charts

Year-end charts

See also
List of number-one adult contemporary singles of 1983 (U.S.)

References

External links
Single release info at discogs.com
 
 

1983 singles
Sérgio Mendes songs
Joe Pizzulo songs
Dionne Warwick songs
Male–female vocal duets
Songs written by Barry Mann
Songs with lyrics by Cynthia Weil
1982 songs
A&M Records singles
Pop ballads